A stub-girder system (or stub girder system) is a model of steel frame structures consisting of beams and decking, originally developed in the early 1970s in part by Joseph Colaco of Ellisor Engineers Inc..

Short lengths of stub girders the same depth as the floor beams are welded to the tops of the main girders to provide a connection to the slab.

References

Iron and steel buildings